The Breakfast Club is an American syndicated radio show based in New York City.  It is hosted by DJ Envy, Charlamagne tha God and rotating guest hosts and celebrities (such as Ray J and Eboni K. Williams).  The Breakfast Club's flagship station is WWPR-FM Power 105.1 and it currently airs in over 90 radio markets around the U.S., including Chicago, Houston, Atlanta and Miami.  

Common topics of discussion on the show are celebrity gossip (especially in the hip hop industry), progressive politics, and sexual and dating issues.  The program is broadcast live on weekdays from 6 to 10 a.m. Eastern Time, with a recorded Saturday morning version.

History 
In December 2010, The Breakfast Club was established on Urban Contemporary station WWPR-FM as a morning drive radio show serving the New York City market.

In April 2013, Premiere Networks (a subsidiary of then Clear Channel Communications, now iHeartMedia) launched a weekend version of the show, Weekends with the Breakfast Club, as a Top 20 Countdown of urban contemporary hits. Four months later, The Breakfast Club, as a weekday offering, was rolled out into syndication.

Based on the show's popularity, cameras were installed in the New York studio from where the show is broadcast. From March 2014 until November 2021, The Breakfast Club was simulcast on television on Revolt.

In January 2020, The Breakfast Club was nominated for an NAACP Image Award in the category of Outstanding News/Information (Series or Special).

In July 2020, The Breakfast Club was nominated for induction into the Radio Hall of Fame. Talk radio industry magazine Talkers included it in its 2020 "Heavy Hundred" list of top 100 influential talk radio shows, calling the show "appointment listening every day for people of color." During the aftermath of the George Floyd protests, the Los Angeles Times called it "a radio forum for the nation’s racial reckoning." As of July 2020 the show reach 8 million listeners a month according to Nielsen.

In August 2020, The Breakfast Club was inducted into the Radio Hall of Fame.

Angela Yee announced her departure from the show on August 10, 2022 on positive terms, as Premiere will give her a daily mid-day syndicated show (Way Up With Angela Yee) which will also originate from WWPR.

Segments

Front Page News
Get It Off Your Chest
The Rumor Report
Donkey of the Day
Freaky Friday (Friday)
Positive note of the day
Call in and Weigh in
Interview
Goon Toons (Friday)
People's Choice Mix
Shoot Your Shot (Tuesday)
Slander the Breakfast Club

Past/recurring segments

 The Freezer
 After the Club
 New Song of the day
 The Decision (Mondays)
 Hoe Appreciation Day 2
 Ask Yee (Wednesday and Thursdays)

Affiliates
Currently there are 80 affiliated stations airing The Breakfast Club radio show.

WWPR-FM New York City, New York (flagship station)
KATZ-FM St. Louis, Missouri
KBGO-HD2/K236BR/KBXT Waco, Texas
KBZE Morgan City, Louisiana
KIIZ-FM Killeen, Texas
KJMH Lake Charles, Louisiana
KKMY-HD2/K277AG Beaumont, Texas 
KMLK El Dorado, Arkansas
KOHT Tucson, Arizona
KOPW Omaha, Nebraska
KPRS Kansas City, Missouri
KQBT Houston, Texas 
KRRQ Lafayette, Louisiana
KRVV Monroe, Louisiana
KTCZ-HD3/K273BH Minneapolis, Minnesota
KYMT-HD2/K280DD Las Vegas, Nevada
KZRR-HD2/K265CA Albuquerque, New Mexico
WAKS-HD2|W291BV Cleveland, Ohio
WAKZ Youngstown, Ohio
WBTP Tampa, Florida
WCZQ Champaign, Illinois
WDAI Myrtle Beach, South Carolina
WDAR-FM Florence, South Carolina
WDBN Dublin, Georgia
WDHT Dayton, Ohio
WEBN-HD3/W272BY Cincinnati, Ohio
WEOA/W253BF Evansville, Indiana
WESE Tupelo, Mississippi
WFBC-HD2/W242BX/W283CG/W299BK Greenville, South Carolina
WFFY Fort Myers, Florida
WFKX Jackson, Tennessee
WFXE Columbus, Georgia
WFZX/W256BF/W257CT Anniston, Alabama
WGCI-FM Chicago, Illinois
WGMY-HD2/W287CO Tallahassee, Florida
WGOV-FM Valdosta, Georgia 
WHKF Harrisburg, Pennsylvania
WHRK  Memphis, Tennessee 
WHXT/WSCZ Columbia, South Carolina
WHYN-HD2/W247DL Springfield, Massachusetts
WIBB-FM Macon, Georgia
WJBT Jacksonville, Florida
WJDX-FM Jackson, Mississippi
WJFX-HD2/W277AK Fort Wayne, Indiana
WJIZ Albany, Georgia
WJLB Detroit, Michigan
WJZD-FM Gulfport, Mississippi
WKCI-HD2/W265DB New Haven, Connecticut
WKKV-FM Milwaukee, Wisconsin
WKTT Ocean City, Maryland
WLKT-HD2/W280DO Lexington, Kentucky
WMIB Miami, Florida
WMJJ-HD2/W281AB Birmingham, Alabama
WMNX Wilmington, North Carolina
WOWE Flint, Michigan
WOWI Norfolk, Virginia
WPRW-FM Augusta, Georgia
WQBK-HD2/W256BU Albany, New York
WQBT Savannah, Georgia
WQHH Lansing, Michigan
WQUE-FM New Orleans, Louisiana
WRDG Atlanta, Georgia 
WRGV Pensacola, Florida
WRSV Raleigh, North Carolina
WTFX-FM Louisville, Kentucky
WTKS-HD2/W283AN Orlando, Florida
WTMG Gainesville, Florida
WUBT Nashville, Tennessee
WUSL Philadelphia, Pennsylvania
WVKS-HD2/W235BH Toledo, Ohio
WWWZ Charleston, South Carolina
WYRB Rockford, Illinois
WZCB Columbus, Ohio
WZFX Fayetteville, North Carolina
WZHT Montgomery, Alabama
WZLD Hattiesburg, Mississippi
WZRL Indianapolis, Indiana
WJQM Madison, Wisconsin
The Beat (online radio station, iHeartRadio)

References

American music radio programs
IHeartRadio digital channels
2010 radio programme debuts